Craidorolț is a commune of 2,215 inhabitants (2011) situated in Satu Mare County, Romania. It is composed of five villages:

Demographics
Ethnic groups (2011 census):
Romanians: 53%
Hungarians: 24%
Roma: 15%
Ukrainians: 3%

55% had Romanian as first language, 37% Hungarian and 3% Ukrainian.

Natives
 Mircea Bolba
 Iuliu Coroianu

References

Communes in Satu Mare County